Club de Fútbol Laguna (nicknamed  La Ola Verde) is a football club. The club played in the Mexican football league system Primera División de México and it was based in Torreón, Coahuila, Mexico.

History 
Club de Fútbol Laguna was founded in 1953 that same year the club join the Segunda División Profesional where they played from 1953 to 1967. It was in 1968 when the club was promoted to the Primera División de México with Juan Ángel "Pito" Pérez coaching the club, who took the place of the regulated Atletico Morelia. The club was merely a contender in the first division but gave the people of the region a chance to see first division action.

Club de Fútbol Laguna was sold in 1978 and the club was moved to Mexico City and became Club Deportivo Coyotes Neza. In 1988 the club was once again sold and moved to Tamaulipas where it became Correcaminos UAT.

Statistics 
Statistics while in 1st Division:

Statistics while Copa Mexico:

GP – Games Played
W – Won
D – Draw
L – Losses
GF – Goals in Favor
GA – Goals Against
Pts – Points
DIF -Difference in Goals

Club Honors 
 Segunda División Profesional (1): 1967–1968
 Runner Up Segunda División Profesional (1): 1966–1967
 Copa Mexico from the Segunda División Profesional (1): 1954–1955
 Runner Up Copa Mexico from the  Segunda División Profesional (2):''' 1955–1956, 1959–1960

See also 
Club de Fútbol Torreón, the predecessor club in the region
Santos Laguna, the modern Liga MX club in the region
Football in Mexico

External links 
  Articule clubs From La Laguna

Association football clubs established in 1953
Football clubs in Coahuila
1953 establishments in Mexico